The 2020 Argentina Women's Hockey National Tournament is the 12th edition of the women's national tournament. It is going to be held from 24 to 27 September 2020.

The competition was first scheduled to be held from 15 to 18 October in Santa Fe, but because of the COVID-19 pandemic the location and date were modified.

On June 11, it was announced that the competition will be postponed to 2021.

Mendoza is the defending champion.

Teams

  Buenos Aires
  Bahía Blanca
  Mar del Plata
  Córdoba
  Mendoza (defending champions)
  Rosario
  San Juan
  Santa Fe

References

2020
2020 in women's field hockey
Hockey